Bocchoropsis plenilinealis is a moth in the family Crambidae. It was described by Harrison Gray Dyar Jr. in 1917. It is found in Guyana, French Guiana, Suriname and Cuba.

The wingspan is about 18 mm. The forewings are straw yellow with brown lines.

References

Moths described in 1917
Spilomelinae